Howard Grenville Davies (born 5 August 1944) is a British sprinter. He competed in the men's 400 metres at the 1968 Summer Olympics.

References

External links
 

1944 births
Living people
Athletes (track and field) at the 1966 British Empire and Commonwealth Games
Athletes (track and field) at the 1968 Summer Olympics
Athletes (track and field) at the 1970 British Commonwealth Games
British male sprinters
Welsh male sprinters
Olympic athletes of Great Britain
Place of birth missing (living people)
Commonwealth Games competitors for Wales
Universiade medalists in athletics (track and field)
Universiade silver medalists for Great Britain